On May 3, 2020, a 28-year-old black transgender woman named Nina Pop was found dead with multiple stab wounds after being stabbed with a knife inside her apartment on South New Madrid Street in Sikeston, Missouri.

Nina Pop 
Pop was a black transgender woman.  She lived 145 miles south of St. Louis in Sikeston, Missouri, a small town of 16,000 people.

Aftermath 
On May 15, 2020 in Dexter, Missouri, Joseph B. Cannon from Poplar Bluff, Missouri, was accused of Pop's murder and arrested for second-degree murder and armed criminal action. He pleaded not guilty, requested a public defender, and awaits trial. 11 crime labs, anti-violence organizations, and police departments contributed to the investigation.

Sikeston Department of Public Safety and a local TV network initially misgendered Pop during their investigation and reporting, respectively.

The Human Rights Campaign stated that her death is at least the 10th violent death of an American transgender person or gender non-conforming person in 2020.

Community response 
The Okra Project, a grassroots organization initially focused on addressing food insecurity in the black transgender community, dedicated $15,000 to form the Nina Pop Mental Health Recovery Fund and the Tony McDade Mental Health Recovery Fund in to raise money for free one-time mental health therapy sessions for black transgender individuals.

On June 2, 2020 thousands of people came together for a vigil and protest at the Stonewall Inn in New York City to honor the lives of Nina Pop and Tony McDade and protest police violence and transphobic violence against the black transgender community.

References 

2020 controversies in the United States
Black Lives Matter
Violence against trans women
Deaths by person in Missouri
LGBT African Americans
LGBT people from Missouri
2020 deaths
Deaths by stabbing in Missouri
May 2020 crimes in the United States
May 2020 events in the United States
2020 in Missouri
Violence against LGBT people in the United States
21st-century LGBT people
History of women in Missouri